Frank Havens may refer to:

Frank C. Havens (1848–1918), American lawyer
Frank Havens (canoeist) (1924–2018), American canoeist